AAPS may refer to:

 Academy of Applied Pharmaceutical Sciences, Toronto, Canada 
 American Association of Physician Specialists, certifying physicians with advanced training
 Anglo-Australian Planet Search
 Ann Arbor Public Schools
 Association of American Physicians and Surgeons, a politically conservative organization

See also

 
 AAP (disambiguation)
 APS (disambiguation)